In mathematics, the Incomplete Polylogarithm function is related to the polylogarithm function. It is sometimes known as the incomplete Fermi–Dirac integral or the incomplete Bose–Einstein integral. It may be defined by:

Expanding about z=0 and integrating gives a series representation:

where Γ(s) is the gamma function and Γ(s,x) is the upper incomplete gamma function. Since Γ(s,0)=Γ(s), it follows that:

where Lis(.) is the polylogarithm function.

References 
 GNU Scientific Library - Reference Manual https://www.gnu.org/software/gsl/manual/gsl-ref.html#SEC117

Special functions